Shotton Hall is a Grade II listed building, formerly a mansion house, now operated by Peterlee Town Council as offices and a conference centre.

History

The Manor of Shotton, near Peterlee, County Durham, was owned by the Thompson family. In 1756 the Thompson heiress, Elizabeth, married Charles Brandling and they commissioned the building of a new mansion to replace the existing manor house.

The Hall was enlarged and improved in about 1820 but the Shotton estate was sold by the Brandlings in 1850 to Shotton Coal Company. The Hall was occupied by the Burdon family and later by a series of tenants. It fell into a state of neglect and disrepair.

Council ownership
In 1949 the Hall was occupied by the Peterlee Development Corporation and in 1984 was acquired by the Peterlee Town Council who restored the property for their own occupation. This is a Grade II listed building.

References

External links

Grade II listed buildings in County Durham
History of County Durham
Country houses in County Durham
Peterlee